Stellwag's sign is a sign of infrequent or incomplete blinking associated with exophthalmos or Graves orbitopathy. It is accompanied by Dalrymple's sign, which is a retraction of the upper eyelids resulting in an apparent widening of the palpebral opening.

Stellwag's sign is named after Austrian ophthalmologist Karl Stellwag von Carion.

References
 Definition at Dorlands Medical Dictionary
 Essay on Graves' Disease

Eye
Symptoms and signs: Endocrinology, nutrition, and metabolism